Syro-Malabar Catholic Eparchy of Adilabad was created by Pope John Paul II on 23 July 1999. The first bishop, Mar Joseph Kunnath, CMI, was ordained bishop on 6 October 1999 at which time the diocese also was inaugurated.

External links
 Syro-Malabar Catholic Diocese of Adilabad at Catholic-Hierarchy

Syro-Malabar Catholic dioceses
Christian organizations established in 1999
Christianity in Telangana
1999 establishments in Andhra Pradesh